Instruments of Africa (IOA) is a United States-based manufacturer of African electric guitar (AEG) that is designed in the shape of the African landscape. It was founded by Ezekiel Olaleye who is a Nigerian-American instrumentalist. 

Instruments of Africa was initially introduced in the United States in 2016, incorporated in 2017, and was subsequently incorporated in Nigeria and United Kingdom.

In 2021, it launches 9 models of guitars in Lagos, Nigeria which were all named after 9 capital cities across the continent of Africa.

References

Guitar manufacturing companies of the United States
2016 establishments in the United States